Nice Package is a 2013 gangster comedy feature starring Dwayne Cameron, Isabella Tannock and Leon Cain. The film is produced by Melanie Poole and directed by Dan Macarthur.

Main cast
Dwayne Cameron
Leon Cain
Isabella Tannock
Renaud Jadin
Ashley Lyons
Ben Weirheim
Ron Kelly

Reception
Film Ink said, "Nice Package is at its best when it wants to make you smile."  DVD Compare, while reviewing the DVD release, said, "Although there are better genre films out there from down under, this is well worth checking out and is better than most."

References

External links

Australian comedy films
2016 films
2016 comedy films
2010s English-language films
2010s Australian films